Bruce Canepa is a retired American race car driver and car dealer. He has competed in IMSA GT, sprint car racing, super modifieds, and the Trans Am Series. He finished third in the 1979 24 Hours of Daytona with co-drivers Rick Mears and Monte Shelton. Canepa has also raced with Bobby Rahal in the first March GTP car. He also competed multiple times in the Pikes Peak Hill Climb. He is currently a regular at the Monterey Historic Automobile Races. His sports and race car restoration facility is located in Scotts Valley, California.

References

External links
 Monterey Historic Automobile Races Selection Committee press release
 Official site (Canepa Design)

American racing drivers
Living people
Trans-Am Series drivers
24 Hours of Daytona drivers
Stadium Super Trucks drivers
People from Scotts Valley, California
Year of birth missing (living people)